Count of Pozos Dulces is a Spanish title created on 24 June 1790, along with the viscountcy of la Albufera, by Charles IV of Spain for Melchor Jacot y Ortiz Rojano, son of José Jacot y Ruiz de la Escalera (1702–1738.)

Melchor Jacot y Ortiz-Rojano was Robed Minister of the 'Consejo Supremo de las Indias', First Regent of Lima's Audience, and Knight of the Order of Carlos III.

According to the Diputación Permanente y Consejo de la Grandeza de España, the title "has been vacant for more than 200 years".

List of the Counts of Pozos Dulces

References

Further reading

Countships
Spanish noble titles